The Pan African Federation of Accountants (PAFA) is the regional body that is aimed to represent African professional accountants with one and louder voice, particularly in relating with International Federation of Accountants (IFAC).  It was inaugurated in Dakar, Senegal on 5 May 2011.

Inauguration

The first president, elected at the inaugural meeting in Dakar, Senegal, was Major General Sebastian Achulike Owuama.
Owuama is also president of the Institute of Chartered Accountants of Nigeria and of the Association of Accountancy Bodies in West Africa.
Dr. Mussa J. Assad of the  National Board of Accountants and Auditors in Tanzania was named vice president. 
The South African Institute of Chartered Accountants in Johannesburg hosts the PAFA Secretariat.

Membership
At time of launch, members were:

Benin 
Botswana – BICA
Burkina Faso  ONECCA-BF
Burundi – OPC
Cameroon 
Congo Brazzaville 
Democratic Republic of Congo – IDRC
Ethiopia – EPAAA 
Gambia 
Ghana – ICAG
Guinea Bissau 
Ivory Coast 
Kenya – ICPAK
Lesotho – LIA 
Liberia 
Libya 
Malawi – SOCAM
Mali 
Mauritius – MIPA
Morocco 
Namibia – CFA, ICAN
Niger 
Nigeria – ICAN
Rwanda – ICPAR
Senegal – ONECCA
Sierra Leone 
South Africa – SAICA, SAIPA
Sudan – SACA
Swaziland – SIA
Tanzania – NBAA
Togo 
Tunisia 
Uganda – ICPA
Zambia – ZICA
Zimbabwe – ICAZ, ICPAZ

References

External links

Pan-African organizations
International accounting organizations